= Rinaa Shah =

Personal information
- Nationality: India

Sport
- Sport: Polo

Rinaa Shah is the first Indian woman professional polo player and a fashion entrepreneur and electronic drummer and DJ.

== Personal life ==
Shah played for the Umaid Bhavan polo Cup, The International Ladies tournament and won the HERMES cup in Jodhpur 2015 December and The Trunks Company polo Cup in 2017.

== Career ==
=== Rinaldi Polo ===
Shah owns a polo team named Rinaldi polo which won he MG & G Area Polo Cup in 2014 and the 2017 Trunks company Polo Cup.

=== Fashion design ===
Shah launched the fashion label "Rinaldi Designs" in 1997.
